Transtillaspis is a genus of moths belonging to the subfamily Tortricinae of the family Tortricidae.

Species
Transtillaspis alluncus Razowski & Pelz, 2005
Transtillaspis anxia Razowski & Brown, 2004
Transtillaspis argentilinea Razowski & Becker, 2002
Transtillaspis armifera Razowski & Wojtusiak, 2006
Transtillaspis atheles Razowski & Wojtusiak, 2011
Transtillaspis atimeta Razowski, 1997
Transtillaspis baea Razowski, 1987
Transtillaspis bascanion Razowski, 1987
Transtillaspis batoidea Razowski, 1987
Transtillaspis bebela Razowski, 1987
Transtillaspis blechra Razowski, 1987
Transtillaspis brachistocera Razowski, 1987
Transtillaspis brandinojuxta Razowski, 1987
Transtillaspis calderana Razowski & Wojtusiak, 2008
Transtillaspis cherada Razowski & Becker, 2001
Transtillaspis chilesana Razowski & Wojtusiak, 2008
Transtillaspis chiribogana Razowski & Wojtusiak, 2008
Transtillaspis cholojuxta Razowski & Wojtusiak, 2010
Transtillaspis cinifera Razowski & Brown, 2004
Transtillaspis cornutipea Razowski, 1997
Transtillaspis cosangana Razowski & Wojtusiak, 2009
Transtillaspis costipuncta Razowski & Wojtusiak, 2009
Transtillaspis cothurnata Razowski & Pelz, 2005
Transtillaspis cracens Razowski & Pelz, 2005
Transtillaspis crepera Razowski & Pelz, 2005
Transtillaspis curiosissima Razowski & Wojtusiak, 2008
Transtillaspis dromadaria Razowski & Wojtusiak, 2008
Transtillaspis emblema Razowski & Pelz, 2005
Transtillaspis empheria Razowski & Pelz, 2005
Transtillaspis ependyma Razowski & Pelz, 2005
Transtillaspis galbana Razowski & Pelz, 2005
Transtillaspis golondrinana Razowski & Wojtusiak, 2008
Transtillaspis hedychnium Razowski, 1991
Transtillaspis hepaticolorana Razowski & Wojtusiak, 2008
Transtillaspis herospina Razowski & Pelz, 2005
Transtillaspis irrorata Razowski & Pelz, 2003
Transtillaspis juxtarmata Razowski & Wojtusiak, 2010
Transtillaspis juxtonca Razowski & Pelz, 2005
Transtillaspis longisetae Razowski & Wojtusiak, 2008
Transtillaspis luiscarlosi Razowski & Pelz, 2003
Transtillaspis lypra Razowski & Pelz, 2005
Transtillaspis mecosacculus Razowski & Pelz, 2005
Transtillaspis mindoana Razowski & Pelz, 2005
Transtillaspis monoloba Razowski & Wojtusiak, 2010
Transtillaspis monoseta Razowski & Pelz, 2003
Transtillaspis multicornuta Razowski & Wojtusiak, 2008
Transtillaspis multisetae Razowski & Pelz, 2003
Transtillaspis nedyma Razowski & Pelz, 2005
Transtillaspis neelys Razowski & Pelz, 2005
Transtillaspis obvoluta Razowski & Wojtusiak, 2010
Transtillaspis papallactana Razowski & Wojtusiak, 2009
Transtillaspis parallela Razowski & Wojtusiak, 2010
Transtillaspis parummaculatum Razowski & Pelz, 2005
Transtillaspis pichinchana Razowski & Wojtusiak, 2008
Transtillaspis plagifascia Razowski & Pelz, 2005
Transtillaspis protungurahuana Razowski & Wojtusiak, 2010
Transtillaspis quatrocornuta Razowski & Wojtusiak, 2008
Transtillaspis rioverdensis Razowski & Pelz, 2005
Transtillaspis saragurana Razowski & Wojtusiak, 2008
Transtillaspis scyruncus Razowski & Wojtusiak, 2013
Transtillaspis sequax Razowski & Wojtusiak, 2013
Transtillaspis setata Razowski & Wojtusiak, 2013
Transtillaspis stiphra Razowski & Wojtusiak, 2013
Transtillaspis tucumana Razowski & Brown, 2004
Transtillaspis tungurahuana Razowski & Pelz, 2005
Transtillaspis zamorana Razowski & Wojtusiak, 2008
Transtillaspis zenenaltana Razowski & Wojtusiak, 2008
Transtillaspis zonion Razowski & Becker, 2001

See also
List of Tortricidae genera

References

 , 2005, World Catalogue of Insects 5
 , 1987, Bull. Acad. Pol. Sci., Sér. Sci. Biol. 35: 73
 , 2006: Tortricidae from Venezuela (Lepidoptera: Tortricidae). Shilap Revista de Lepidopterologia 34 133): 35-79 
 , 2009: Tortricidae (Lepidoptera) from the mountains of Ecuador and remarks on their geographical distribution. Part IV. Eastern Cordillera. Acta Zoologica Cracoviensia 51B (1-2): 119–187. doi:10.3409/azc.52b_1-2.119-187. Full article: .
 , 2010: Tortricidae (Lepidoptera) from Peru. Acta Zoologica Cracoviensia 53B (1-2): 73–159. . Full article: .
 , 2011: Tortricidae (Lepidoptera) from Colombia. Acta Zoologica Cracoviensia 54B (1-2): 103–128. Full article: .
 , 2013: Accessions to the fauna of Neotropical Tortricidae (Lepidoptera). Acta Zoologica Cracoviensia, 56 (1): 9-40. Full article: .

External links
tortricidae.com

 
Euliini
Tortricidae genera